The Zinsser SmartCoat 200 was a 75-mile (120.701 km) West Series and ARCA Menards Series race held at Lebanon I-44 Speedway in Lebanon, Missouri. It has been held twice, with the inaugural running being as a NASCAR K&N Pro Series West (later ARCA Menards Series West) race in 2013. The second running of the race was a part of the ARCA Menards Series schedule in 2020 to replace the race at Madison International Speedway, which was cancelled due to COVID-19 state regulations in Wisconsin.

History
Michael Self is the only driver to have competed in both races at the track. He ran full-time in the West Series in 2013 and ran full-time in the ARCA Menards Series in 2020. He won the 2013 race to score his third win in a row of the season (which were all the races he won that year) and finished sixth in the 2020 race.

Past winners

NASCAR K&N Pro Series West

* Race extended due to a green-white-checker finish.

ARCA Menards Series

References

External links
 

2013 establishments in Missouri
ARCA Menards Series races
ARCA Menards Series
ARCA Menards Series West
Motorsport in Missouri